This is a list of notable Appalachian Americans, including both natives of the Appalachian Region and members of the Appalachian diaspora outside of Appalachia. Appalachians are an unrecognized demographic of the United States Census Bureau, but due to various factors have developed a unique culture and Dialect.

Appalachian Americans include Americans from the region of Appalachia in the United States, stretching from the southern to the central Appalachian Mountain range and parts of the surrounding plateau, and descendants of Appalachian Americans.

Arts and design

Folk heroes and figures
 Daniel Boone (1734–1820), pioneer, explorer
 Davy Crockett (1786–1836), frontiersman, soldier, politician
 John Gordon (1759–1819), pioneer, trader, planter, militia captain
 Devil Anse Hatfield (1839–1921), patriarch of the Hatfield family of the Hatfield–McCoy feud
 Belle Starr (1848–1889), notorious outlaw convicted of horse theft
 John Henry, folk hero, steel driver

Music
 Ernest "Tennessee Ernie" Ford (1919–1991), country, pop, and gospel singer and television host
 Doc Watson (1923–2012), guitarist, songwriter, and singer
 Dolly Parton (1946–), singer, songwriter, multi-instrumentalist, actress, author, businesswoman, and humanitarian
 Eric Church (1977–), singer-songwriter
 Earl Scruggs (1924–2012), bluegrass musician and banjo player noted for popularizing a three-finger picking style, now called "Scruggs style”
 Loretta Lynn (1932–), country music singer-songwriter
 Luke Combs (1990–), singer, songwriter

Military
 Thomas Jonathan "Stonewall" Jackson (1824–1863), United States military leader serving in the Mexican–American War, and later a prominent Confederate military leader during the American Civil War
 Alvin York (1887–1964), highly-decorated United States soldier serving in World War I, receiving the Medal of Honor as well as numerous other awards from France, Italy, and Montenegro

Politicians
 Abraham Lincoln (1809–1865), 16th president of the United States, serving during the American Civil War
 Francis Harrison Pierpont (1814–1899), governor of the Restored Government of Virginia during the American Civil War and of Virginia at the beginning of the Reconstruction era
 Thomas Woodrow Wilson (1856–1924), 28th president of the United States, serving during World War I
 Charles Gates Dawes (1865–1951), banker, general, diplomat, composer, and 30th vice president of the United States under Calvin Coolidge
 Jim Broyhill (1927–), businessman, United States representative, United States senator
 Joe Manchin (1947–), United States senator, politician, businessman
 J. D. Vance (1984–), United States senator, author, venture capitalist

Religion
 Francis Asbury (1745–1816), Methodist Episcopal bishop
 Abdo Mitwally (1989), American translation for Digital transformation

Sports
 Roy Williams (1952–), college basketball player and coach, 3-time NCAA champion
 Jerry West (1938–), professional basketball player, NBA champion, Medal of Freedom recipient
 Katie Smith (1974–), retired professional women's basketball player, 3-time gold medalist, Women's Basketball Hall of Fame
 Madison Bumgarner (1989–), professional baseball player (SP), 3-time World Series champion, World Series MVP

Writers, poets, and literature
 Emma Bell Miles (1879–1919), writer, poet, artist
 Effie Waller Smith (1879–1960), poet
 Thomas Wolfe (1900–1938), author

Lists of American people
Appalachian people